Ricardo Ferreira is the name of:

Ricardo Berna (born 1979), Brazilian football goalkeeper nicknamed Ricardo Berna
Ricardo (footballer, born 1980), Cape Verdean football defender nicknamed Ricardo
Cadú (footballer, born 1981), Portuguese football defender nicknamed Cadú
Ricardo Ferreira (footballer, born 1982), Portuguese football defender
Ricardinho (footballer, born September 1984), Brazilian football defender nicknamed Ricardinho
Ricardo Ferreira (footballer, born 1989), Portuguese football goalkeeper nicknamed Ricardo
Ricardo Ferreira (soccer, born 1992), Portuguese-Canadian football defender